Trip Reset is a 1996 album credited to Genesis P-Orridge and Psychic TV featuring The Angels of Light.

The title is a colloquialism of P-Orridge's. S/he used this term to describe the act of taking a psychedelic to "reset" patterns of personal thought and behavior.

It includes a cover of Pink Floyd's "Set the Controls for the Heart of the Sun", a tribute to Syd Barrett called "A Star Too Far", and a tribute to The West Coast Pop Art Experimental Band called "Suspicious".

Track listing

 "The La La Song"
 "Set the Controls for the Heart of the Sun"
 "I Believe What You Said"
 "Mother Jack (A Children's Story)"
 "Wrongs Of Spring"
 "Lady Maybe"
 "White Sky"
 "Black Cat"
 "A Star Too Far" (Lullaby For Syd Barrett)
 "Suspicious (West Coast Experimental Pop Art Mix)"
 "Firewoman (Exhuma Exhortation)"

Personnel

William Breeze - Electric Viola and Viola Synthesizer
Michael Campagna - Lead Guitar and Guitar Synthesizer
Billy "Pink" Goodrum - Keyboards
Genesis P-Orridge - Lead Vocals, Harmonies, Analog Effects, Analog Samples
Larry Thrasher - Lead Guitars, Bass Guitars, Analog Synthesizer, Tabla, Percussion, Backing Vocals
Mother Jack - Children's Method Storytelling, Background Voices
Caresse P-Orridge - Backing Vocals, Harmonies, Analog Keyboards
Genesse P-Orridge - Backing Vocals, Harmonies, Analog Keyboards

Cold Blue Torch

Cold Blue Torch is a remix album of some songs from the album Trip/Reset.

Track listing
"Wrongs Of Spring (Paul Raven Mix)" - 6:00
Remix - Paul Raven
"Fire Woman (cEvin Key Mix)" - 4:51
Remix - cEvin Key
"Lady Maybe (Dub Me Maybe Mix)" - 6:06
Remix - DJ Cheb I Sabbah Wa Mektoub
"I Believe What You Said (Leæther Strip Version)" - 6:08
Remix - Leæther Strip, Claus Larsen
"Suspicious (Unfaithful Mix)" - 4:24
Remix - Tom Muschitz
"Fire Woman (Fabrique Club Mix)" - 5:10
Remix - Martin Atkins
"I Believe What You Said (Spahn Ranch Mix)" - 4:33
Remix - Spahn Ranch, Matt Green
"I Believe What You Said (Oneiroid Psychosis Mix)" - 4:29
Remix - Oneiroid Psychosis

Personnel
Judson Leach, Lori Sprester, Larry Thrasher, Chris Peterson, Anthony Valcic, Martin Atkins - engineers
Curse Mackey - sampler
BobDog - guitar
William Breeze - viola
Roberto Castello - congas
Genesis P-Orridge - artwork

References

External links 

 Head Heritage review - Trip Reset
 Option review - Trip Reset
 AllMusic review - Cold Blue Torch

Psychic TV albums
1996 albums